VRK may refer to:

Military Revolutionary Committee (Russian: Военно-революционный комитет)
Population Register Centre (Finland) (Finnish: Väestörekisterikeskus)
VRK1, gene and enzyme
VRK2, gene and enzyme
VRK Tigrarna, Swedish rugby team
Very restricted knowledge